Al-Hurriyah is a village in northern Syria located in the Qalaat al-Madiq Subdistrict of the al-Suqaylabiyah District in Hama Governorate. According to the Syria Central Bureau of Statistics (CBS), al-Hurriyah had a population of 2,525 in the 2004 census. Its inhabitants are predominantly Sunni Muslims.

References 

Populated places in al-Suqaylabiyah District
Populated places in al-Ghab Plain